Aidan Browne (born 1998) is an Irish Gaelic footballer who plays for Premier Intermediate Championship club Newmarket and at inter-county level with the Cork senior football team. He usually lines out as a wing-back.

He and Killian O'Hanlon sustained cruciate injuries in separate incidents when training resumed ahead of the delayed 2021 season. They were both ruled out for the season.

References

External link
Aidan Browne profile at the Cork GAA website

1998 births
Living people
Newmarket Gaelic footballers
CIT Gaelic footballers
Cork inter-county Gaelic footballers